Kendall Reginald James von Tunzelmann Saxon  (1 November 1894 – 1 June 1976) was a New Zealand soldier, first-class cricketer and educator.

Ken Saxon was born in Nelson, New Zealand, one of seven children of James and Clara Saxon. He was educated at Nelson College and returned to teach there in 1913.

Saxon served in the First World War as an officer in the New Zealand Rifle Brigade. While serving as a lieutenant in the 4th Battalion in 1916 he was awarded the Military Cross for "conspicuous gallantry in action". In 1918, as a captain in the 1st Battalion, he was awarded a bar to his MC for "conspicuous gallantry and devotion to duty". Each time he had shown courage and leadership under fire, the first time while wounded. His older brother Jack was killed at the Somme in 1916.

In October 1919 he began studying science at Emmanuel College, Cambridge. He represented Cambridge in the rugby match against Oxford in 1920, but a war wound to his knee prevented his taking part in 1921. He won the long jump at the Cambridge University sports in 1921 with a jump of 21 feet 9 inches, beating the future Olympian Harold Abrahams by one inch. He graduated in June 1922, married Frances Smyth of Monks Kirby, Warwickshire, in Farnham Royal, Buckinghamshire, on 29 June, and sailed for New Zealand on 20 July to take up a position at Nelson College.

Saxon captained Nelson when they won the Hawke Cup from Wanganui in January 1924, opening the batting and making the two highest scores of the match, 59 and 42 not out. A month later he was selected in the Canterbury team to play a first-class match against the touring New South Wales, again opening the batting, and making 43 and 0.

He returned to England in the mid-1920s, taking up a teaching position in Cambridgeshire. At the end of 1928 he began teaching at Merchant Taylors' School, Northwood.

He played regularly for the Cambridgeshire team in Minor Counties cricket from 1927 to 1934. His highest score in Minor Counties cricket was 160, opening the batting against Surrey Second XI in 1933.

He married for a second time in May 1931 to Elizabeth Francis of Cambridge. They lived in London.

References

External links

1894 births
1976 deaths
People from Nelson, New Zealand
New Zealand military personnel of World War I
New Zealand Army officers
New Zealand recipients of the Military Cross
Victoria University of Wellington alumni
New Zealand cricketers
Canterbury cricketers
Alumni of Emmanuel College, Cambridge
Cambridge University R.U.F.C. players
Cambridgeshire cricketers
New Zealand schoolteachers
New Zealand emigrants to the United Kingdom
People educated at Nelson College
Nelson College faculty